The 1926 season of the Paraguayan Primera División, the top category of Paraguayan football, was played by 10 teams. The national champions were Nacional.

Results

Standings

External links
Paraguay 1926 season at RSSSF

Paraguayan Primera División seasons
Para
1